Havre de Grace Seaplane Base  is a privately owned, public-use seaplane base located one nautical mile (2 km) east of the central business district of Havre de Grace, a city in Harford County, Maryland, United States. It is located on the west side of Chesapeake Bay.

Facilities and aircraft 
The publicly-used Seaplane Base is located at the mouth of the Chesapeake Bay, on the Susquehanna River. Pilots land aircraft on the water then taxi to the loading dock. The floating airport includes a docking and storage facility for aircraft, similar to a land-based terminal.
For the 12-month period ending March 19, 2007, the airport had 240 general aviation aircraft operations.

References

External links 
 

Airports in Maryland
Buildings and structures in Havre de Grace, Maryland
Seaplane bases in the United States
Transportation buildings and structures in Harford County, Maryland